The following low-power television stations broadcast on digital or analog channel 33 in the United States:

 K23KR-D in Alton, Utah
 K33AC-D in Pawnee City, Nebraska
 K33AF-D in Ninilchik, Alaska
 K33CP-D in Gold Beach, Oregon
 K33DO-D in Vernal, Utah
 K33DR-D in Montpelier, Idaho
 K33DS-D in Freedom-Etna, Wyoming
 K33EA-D in Columbus, Montana
 K33EB-D in Cedar Canyon, Utah
 K33EJ-D in Walla Walla, Washington
 K33ER-D in Verdi/Mogul, Nevada
 K33FF-D in Wallace, etc., Nebraska
 K33FI-D in Akron, Colorado
 K33FK-D in Angel Fire, New Mexico
 K33FL-D in Las Vegas, New Mexico
 K33FO-D in Benkelman, Nebraska
 K33FS-D in La Grande, Oregon
 K33FT-D in Manti/Ephraim, Utah
 K33FX-D in Heber/Midway, Utah
 K33FY-D in Park City, Utah
 K33GA-D in Grants/Milan, New Mexico
 K33GB-D in Golconda, Nevada
 K33GC-D in Capulin, etc., New Mexico
 K33GF-D in Preston, Idaho
 K33GJ-D in Merlin, Oregon
 K33GM-D in Haxtun, Colorado
 K33GX-D in Springfield, South Dakota
 K33GZ-D in Hawthorne, Nevada
 K33HG-D in Quanah, Texas
 K33HH-D in Redding, California
 K33HO-D in Soda Springs, Idaho
 K33HX-D in Tropic & Cannonville, Utah
 K33HY-D in Basalt, Colorado
 K33IB-D in Silver Springs, Nevada
 K33ID-D in Ridgecrest, California
 K33IM-D in Malad City, Idaho
 K33IW-D in Coaldale, Colorado
 K33IX-D in Rock Springs, Wyoming
 K33IY-D in Le Chee, etc., Arizona
 K33IZ-D in Boulder, Utah
 K33JE-D in Modena/Beryl, etc., Utah
 K33JG-D in Peoa/Oakley, Utah
 K33JI-D in Scofield, Utah
 K33JM-D in Mooreland, etc., Oklahoma
 K33JQ-D in Big Piney, etc., Wyoming
 K33JW-D in Rockville/Springdale, Utah
 K33KD-D in London Springs, Oregon
 K33KE-D in Sargents, Colorado
 K33KF-D in Kanarraville, etc., Utah
 K33KH-D in Nephi, Utah
 K33KI-D in Spring Glen, Utah
 K33KJ-D in Crested Butte, Colorado
 K33KV-D in Lamar, Colorado
 K33KW-D in Delta, etc., Utah
 K33LA-D in Duchesne, Utah
 K33LB-D in Redwood Falls, Minnesota
 K33LF-D in Lewiston, Montana
 K33LG-D in Bridger, etc., Montana
 K33LN-D in Minneapolis, Minnesota
 K33LV-D in Henefer, etc., Utah
 K33LW-D in Sandpoint, Idaho
 K33LZ-D in Myrtle Point, Oregon
 K33MC-D in Forsyth, Montana
 K33MD-D in Yuma, Arizona
 K33MI-D in Aberdeen, South Dakota
 K33MJ-D in Pahrump, Nevada
 K33MN-D in Jefferson City, Missouri
 K33MW-D in Sherburn, Minnesota
 K33NM-D in Omak, etc., Washington
 K33NP-D in Russell, Kansas
 K33NV-D in Strong City, Oklahoma
 K33NX-D in Carlsbad, New Mexico
 K33NY-D in Roseburg, Oregon
 K33NZ-D in Cottonwood, Arizona
 K33OB-D in Roswell, New Mexico
 K33OD-D in Kingman, Arizona
 K33OE-D in Penasco, New Mexico
 K33OG-D in Max, Minnesota
 K33OH-D in Ferndale, etc., Montana
 K33OI-D in Hanksville, Utah
 K33OJ-D in Garfield, etc., Utah
 K33OK-D in Overton, Nevada
 K33OL-D in Fremont, Utah
 K33OM-D in Caineville, Utah
 K33OO-D in Antimony, Utah
 K33OP-D in Helena, Montana
 K33OQ-D in Escalante, Utah
 K33OR-D in St. Ignatius, Montana
 K33OU-D in Fountain Green, Utah
 K33OV-D in Whitehall, Montana
 K33OW-D in Neligh, Nebraska
 K33OX-D in Samak, Utah
 K33OZ-D in Parowan, Enoch, etc., Utah
 K33PA-D in Sterling, Colorado
 K33PB-D in Grand Junction, Colorado
 K33PC-D in Santa Clara, Utah
 K33PD-D in Toquerville, Hurricane, Utah
 K33PE-D in Truth or Consequences, New Mexico
 K33PF-D in Beaver, etc., Utah
 K33PG-D in Socorro, New Mexico
 K33PH-D in Garrison, etc., Utah
 K33PI-D in Eureka, Nevada
 K33PJ-D in Emery, Utah
 K33PK-D in Green River, Utah
 K33PL-D in Birchdale, Minnesota
 K33PM-D in Grants Pass, Oregon
 K33PN-D in Ferron, Utah
 K33PO-D in Clear Creek, Utah
 K33PQ-D in Manila, etc, Utah
 K33PS-D in Randolph, Utah
 K33PU-D in Yuma, Colorado
 K33PV-D in Rock Rapids, Iowa
 K33PX-D in Clarendon, Texas
 K33PZ-D in Julesburg, Colorado
 K33QC-D in Window Rock, Arizona
 K33QD-D in Zuni Pueblo, New Mexico
 K33QF-D in Holbrook, Idaho
 K33QH-D in San Angelo, Texas
 K33QL-D in Snowmass Village, Colorado
 K40JM-D in Kanab, Utah
 K42DD-D in Joplin, Montana
 K44AG-D in Blanding/Monticello, Utah
 K46AC-D in Willmar, Minnesota
 K49EQ-D in Cortez, etc., Colorado
 K50DB-D in Alexandria, Minnesota
 K51BA-D in Fort Peck, Montana
 K51EF-D in Coolin, Idaho
 KBSE-LD in Boise, etc., Idaho, an ATSC 3.0 station
 KCCF-LD in Atascadero, California
 KCPN-LD in Amarillo, Texas
 KDFX-CD in Indio/Palm Springs, California
 KDGU-LD in Ulysses, Kansas
 KEMY-LD in Eureka, California
 KGEW-LD in Port Arthur, Texas
 KGKC-LD in Lawrence, Kansas
 KGOF-LD in Fresno, California
 KGSC-LD in Cheyenne, Wyoming
 KHMF-LD in Fort Smith, Arkansas
 KHSB-LD in Steamboat Springs, Colorado
 KJTV-CD in Lubbock, Texas
 KNPB in Incline Village, Nevada
 KQHD-LD in Hardin, Montana
 KQSX-LD in Cal - Oregon, California
 KQZY-LD in Victoria, Texas
 KRPC-LP in Rapid City, South Dakota
 KSCW-DT in Wichita, Kansas
 KSSJ-LD in San Antonio, Texas
 KSUD-LD in Salt Lake City, Utah
 KUOC-LD in Enid, Oklahoma
 KVVB-LD in Lucerne Valley, California
 W33DH-D in Eau Claire, Wisconsin
 W33DN-D in Florence, South Carolina
 W33EB-D in Olive Hill, Tennessee
 W33ED-D in Vieques, Puerto Rico
 W33EG-D in Lumberton, Mississippi
 W33EH-D in Black Mountain, North Carolina
 W33EI-D in Raleigh, North Carolina
 W33EJ-D in Moorefield, West Virginia
 W33EL-D in Caguas, Puerto Rico
 W33EM-D in PIttsburgh, Pennsylvania
 W33ER-D in Augusta, Georgia
 W33EU-D in Athens, Georgia
 W33EV-D in Valdosta, Georgia
 WBGR-LD in Bangor/Dedham, Maine
 WCAC-LD in Lagrange, Georgia
 WFRZ-LD in Montgomery, Alabama
 WGCT-LD in Tampa, Florida
 WILT-LD in Wilmington, North Carolina
 WIRE-CD in Atlanta, Georgia
 WJAN-CD in Miami, Florida
 WJGC-LD in Jacksonville, North Carolina
 WKXT-LD in Knoxville, Tennessee
 WNBD-LD in Grenada, Mississippi
 WNGS-LD in Greenville, South Carolina
 WNGX-LD in Schenectady, New York
 WNXG-LD in Tallahassee, Florida
 WOCW-LD in Charleston, West Virginia
 WOHO-CD in Holland, Michigan
 WOKZ-CD in Kalamazoo, Michigan
 WORK-LP in Nashua, New Hampshire
 WOWZ-LD in Salisbury, Maryland
 WPDP-CD in Cleveland, Tennessee
 WQDT-LD in Lumberton, Mississippi
 WQHI-LD in Myrtle Beach, South Carolina
 WQIZ-LD in Ashland, Ohio
 WTNG-CD in Lumberton-Pembroke, North Carolina
 WTSG-LD in Tifton, Georgia
 WUJF-LD in Jacksonville, Florida
 WVVC-LD in Utica, New York
 WWHB-CD in Stuart, Florida
 WXCK-LD in Chiefland, Florida

The following low-power stations, which are no longer licensed, formerly broadcast on digital or analog channel 33:
 K33AG in Bend, Oregon
 K33BN in Taos, New Mexico
 K33BV in Fraser, etc., Colorado
 K33CF-D in Wellington, Texas
 K33CQ-D in Canadian, Texas
 K33DI in East Weed, California
 K33DL in Eureka, Utah
 K33DP in Carlin, Nevada
 K33FD in Blythe, California
 K33FW in Rural Beaver, etc., Utah
 K33HD in Starr Valley, Nevada
 K33HP in Samak, Utah
 K33HQ in Wanship, Utah
 K33IC in Topeka, Kansas
 K33JB-D in Orderville, Utah
 K33KC in Wadena, Minnesota
 K33OS-D in Granite Falls, Minnesota
 K33PW-D in Moses Lake, Washington
 K33PY-D in Round Mountain, Nevada
 KKOM-LD in Lufkin, Texas
 KMAS-LD in Denver, Colorado
 KSRW-LP in Mammoth Lakes, etc., California
 KTDS-LD in Ted's Place, Colorado
 W33AD in Concord, Virginia
 W33AL in Brunswick, Georgia
 WBXG-LD in Gainesville, Florida
 WHIG-LP in Rocky Mount, North Carolina
 WUCU-LD in Evansville, Indiana

References

33 low-power